Inauguration of Woodrow Wilson may refer to: 

First inauguration of Woodrow Wilson, 1913
Second inauguration of Woodrow Wilson, 1917

See also